Branner may refer to:

People
Hans Christian Branner (1903–1966), Danish author
John Casper Branner (1850–1922), U.S. geologist and President of Stanford University
Martin Branner (1888–1970), U.S. cartoonist and vaudevillian
Robert Branner (1927–1973), U.S. art historian

Buildings
Branner-Hicks House, National Register historic building in Jefferson City, Tennessee; named after Benjamin Manassah Branner
Branner Hall, a student dormitory at Stanford University; named after John Casper Branner

Other
Branner Earth Sciences Library, one of Stanford University's library collections, named after John Casper Branner